Nonilobal Hien (born 15 July 1964) is a Burkinabé judoka who competed at the 1992 Summer Olympics.

Hien competed in the extra-lightweight contest at the 1992 Summer Olympics, but he lost in the first round against Bosolo Mobando from Zaire after 1 minute and 34 seconds.

References

1964 births
Living people
Olympic judoka of Burkina Faso
Judoka at the 1992 Summer Olympics
Burkinabé male judoka
21st-century Burkinabé people